The 2010 V-League season was the 54th season of Vietnam's professional football league.

The league and cup winners would enter the 2011 AFC Cup.

The bottom side at the end of the season get relegated. The side that finishes 2ND from bottom enters an end of season play-off match against the 2nd Division's 2nd placed side.

Teams
Ho Chi Minh City and Thanh Hóa  were relegated to the 2010 Vietnam First Division after finishing the 2009 season in the bottom two places.

The two relegated teams were replaced by 2009 Vietnam First Division champions XM The Vissai Ninh Bình and runners-up Hòa Phát Hà Nội.

Nam Định defeated Thành phố Cần Thơ in the end of season promotion/relegation match to secure their place in the V. League.

Thể Công and Quân Khu 4 were renamed to Viettel F.C. and Navibank Sài Gòn at the end of the 2009 campaign.  Viettel then sold their V. League slot to Thanh Hóa, to allow them to stay in the V. League after being relegated the previous season.

Stadia and locations

Managerial changes

League table

Top scorers

Awards

Monthly awards

Relegation play-off

References

External links
Vietnam Football Federation

Vietnamese Super League seasons
Vietnam
Vietnam
1